"Woman Work" is a poem composed by Maya Angelou. In this poem, Angelou writes about the work women often do, and she expresses a wish to rest from the many tasks women have to complete.

Notes 

Poetry by Maya Angelou